The 1935 Little All-America college football team is composed of college football players from small colleges and universities who were selected by the Associated Press (AP) as the best players at each position. For 1935, the AP did not select a second team but instead chose multiple players for "honorable mention" at each position.

Selections
QB - Will Roy, Loyola (New Orleans)
HB - Johnny Oravec, Willamette
HB - Mickey Kobrosky, Trinity (CT)
FB - James Fraley, Emporia
E - Robert Klein, Chattanooga
E - Red Ramsey, Texas Tech
T - Art Lewis, Ohio
T - Edwin Garland, Catawba
G - Virgil Baer, Kansas Wesleyan
G - John Butler, San Diego State
C - S. Woodrow Sponaugle, Franklin & Marshall

See also
 1935 College Football All-America Team

References

Little All-America college football team
Little All-America college football teams